Moozhikkulam is a village in Chengamanad Panchayath near Angamaly in Eranakulam district in the Indian state of Kerala. This village is situated at the banks of Chalakkudy river, 4.5 km from Chengamanad. 

Thirumoozhikkulam Lakshmana Perumal Temple is situated here.

References

Villages in Ernakulam district